Jhi Yeon-woo (born April 26, 1984) was a female bodybuilder.

Contest history
 2017 New York PRO Show 5th
 2016 New York PRO Show 3rd 
 2016 WOMEN'S PHYSIQUE INTERNATIONAL COMPETITORS 
 2015 IFBB Vancouver Pro show Woman's Physique 4th
 2013 Arnold Classic Europe Physique 1st (got the IFBB Pro card)
 2012 MISS KOREA 3rd
 2011 NPC Excalibur Woman bodybuilding 2nd
 2011 Muscle Beach International figure Open Classic overall winner
 2010 Korea YMCA over 52 kg 1st

References

2016 Arnold Sports Festival Coverage - Bodybuilding.com
2013 Arnold Classic Europe Women's Physique competition result
Arnold Classic Europe Physique video from Andro clips
Muscle Beach International figure Open Classic overall winner Jhi Yeon-woo profile from Bodybuilding.com

External links

Living people
South Korean female bodybuilders
1984 births